George Edward Mara,  (December 12, 1921 – August 30, 2006) was a Canadian businessman and Olympian hockey player. He was a member of the Ottawa RCAF Flyers who won the gold medal in ice hockey for Canada at the 1948 Winter Olympics in St. Moritz.

Background
Born in Toronto, Ontario, he was educated at Upper Canada College and played for the Toronto Marlboros junior hockey team. After declining an offer from the Detroit Red Wings during World War II, he instead served as a Lieutenant in the Royal Canadian Navy. After the war, he played for the Royal Canadian Air Force Flyers in the 1948 Winter Olympics and was captain of the gold medal team.

He also joined the family business, William Mara Company, an importer of wines and spirits. He sold the company in the early 1970s and joined Jannock Corporation where he was vice-chairman.

He was one of the founders and chairman of the Olympic Trust of Canada, the fundraising arm of the Canadian Olympic Association (now the Canadian Olympic Committee), which raised millions of dollars to help support Canadian athletes.

From 1957 to 1969, he was a director of Maple Leaf Gardens and briefly became President in 1969.

He died in 2006 while undergoing heart surgery.

Honours
In 1976, he was made a Member of the Order of Canada "for his tireless efforts in raising funds to support Canadian Olympic athletes competing in Munich and Montreal."  *In 1993, he was inducted into Canada's Sports Hall of Fame.
In 2001 George Mara was honoured by the Canadian Forces when it was announced that the 1948 RCAF Flyers were selected as Canada’s greatest military athletes of the 20th century.

References

Sources

External links
 
 
 
 

1921 births
2006 deaths
Businesspeople from Toronto
Canadian ice hockey players
Canadian military personnel of World War II
Canadian sports businesspeople
Ice hockey people from Toronto
Olympic ice hockey players of Canada
Ice hockey players at the 1948 Winter Olympics
Medalists at the 1948 Winter Olympics
Members of the Order of Canada
Olympic gold medalists for Canada
Olympic medalists in ice hockey
Royal Canadian Navy officers
Upper Canada College alumni